Pyeongchon Management High School is a public high school, located in 186 Hagui-ro, Dongan-gu, Anyang, Gyeonggi, South Korea.

Notable alumni

 Kim Yeon-ji

References

External links
 Official website

High schools in South Korea
Educational institutions established in 1994
1994 establishments in South Korea